A Bugged Out Mix may refer to:

 A Bugged Out Mix (Felix da Housecat album)
 A Bugged Out Mix (Miss Kittin album)
 A Bugged Out Mix by Klaxons, an album by Klaxons